Jungermanniales is the largest order of liverworts. They are distinctive among the liverworts for having thin leaf-like flaps on either side of the stem. Most other liverworts are thalloid, with no leaves. Due to their dorsiventral organization and scale-like, overlapping leaves, the Jungermanniales are sometimes called "scale-mosses".

Families of Jungermanniales
An updated classification by Söderström  et al. 2016
 Cephaloziineae Schljakov [Jamesoniellineae]
 Adelanthaceae Grolle 1972 [Jamesoniellaceae He-Nygrén et al. 2006]
 Anastrophyllaceae Söderström et al. 2010b
 Cephaloziaceae Migula 1904
 Cephaloziellaceae Douin 1920 [Phycolepidoziaceae Schuster 1967]
 Lophoziaceae Cavers 1910
 Scapaniaceae Migula 1904 [Diplophyllaceae Potemk. 1999; Chaetophyllopsaceae Schuster 1960]
 Jungermanniineae Schuster ex Stotler & Crandall-Stotler 2000 [Geocalycineae Schuster 1972]
 Acrobolbaceae Hodgson 1962
 Antheliaceae Schuster 1963
 Arnelliaceae Nakai 1943
 Balantiopsidaceae Buch 1955
 Blepharidophyllaceae Schuster 2002
 Calypogeiaceae Arnell 1928 [Mizutaniaceae Furuki & Iwatsuki 1989]
 Endogemmataceae Konstantinova, Vilnet & Troitsky 2011
 Geocalycaceae von Klinggräff 1858
 Gymnomitriaceae von Klinggräff 1858
 Gyrothyraceae Schuster 1970
 Harpanthaceae Arnell 1928
 Hygrobiellaceae Konstantinova & Vilnet 2014
 Jackiellaceae Schuster 1972
 Jungermanniaceae Reichenbach 1828 [Mesoptychiaceae Inoue & Steere 1975; Delavayellaceae Schuster 1961]
 Notoscyphaceae Crandall-Stotler, Vana & Stotler
 Saccogynaceae Heeg
 Solenostomataceae Stotler & Crandall-Stotler 2009
 Southbyaceae Váňa et al. 2012
 Stephaniellaceae Schuster 2002
 Trichotemnomataceae Schuster 1972
 Lophocoleineae Schljakov 1972 [Pseudolepicoleineae; Trichocoleineae]
 Blepharostomataceae Frey & Stech 2008
 Brevianthaceae Engel & Schuster 1981
 Chonecoleaceae Schuster ex Grolle 1972
 Grolleaceae Solari ex Schuster 1984
 Herbertaceae Müller ex Fulford & Hatcher 1958
 Lepicoleaceae Schuster 1963 [Vetaformataceae Fulford & Taylor 1963]
 Lepidoziaceae Limpricht 1877 [Neogrollaceae]
 Lophocoleaceae Vanden Berghen 1956
 Mastigophoraceae Schuster 1972
 Plagiochilaceae Müller & Herzog 1956
 Pseudolepicoleaceae Fulford & Taylor 1960
 Trichocoleaceae Nakai 1943
 Myliineae Engel & Braggins ex Crandall-Stotler et al.
 Myliaceae Schljakov 1975
 Perssoniellineae Schuster 1963
 Schistochilaceae Buch 1928 [Perssoniellaceae Schuster ex Grolle 1972]

References

External links 
 
 
  Photos of species

 
Liverwort orders